The 1966 Ball State Cardinals football team was an American football team that represented Ball State University in the Indiana Collegiate Conference (ICC) during the 1966 NCAA College Division football season. In its fifth season under head coach Ray Louthen, the team compiled a 7–1–1 record.

Schedule

References

Ball State
Ball State Cardinals football seasons
Ball State Cardinals football